Klena ("Klenie") Geertje Bimolt (born 8 June 1945 in Assen, Drenthe) is a former breaststroke swimmer from the Netherlands, who won the silver medal in the 4 × 100 medley relay at the 1964 Summer Olympics. She did so together with her team mates Corrie Winkel, Ada Kok and Erica Terpstra. The same year, she helped the Dutch team to set the world record in the same event. Bimolt also competed at the 1968 Summer Olympics in the 4 × 100 medley relay, but finished seventh. She won two silver medals at the 1962 European Aquatics Championships

Nationally, she dominated breastroke in the 1960s, setting 13 records and winning all 100 m and 200 m titles in 1962–1965 and 1967, as well as 200 m in 1968 (after Marjan Janus). She also broke four European records: one in the 100 m breastroke (1964) and three in the 4×100 m medley relay (1964, 1968).

References

1945 births
Living people
Dutch female breaststroke swimmers
Olympic swimmers of the Netherlands
Swimmers at the 1964 Summer Olympics
Swimmers at the 1968 Summer Olympics
Olympic silver medalists for the Netherlands
People from Assen
World record setters in swimming
Medalists at the 1964 Summer Olympics
European Aquatics Championships medalists in swimming
Olympic silver medalists in swimming
Sportspeople from Drenthe